Emilia Wint is an American professional skier from Denver, CO. They joined the U.S. Ski Team in 2012 as part of the slopestyle ski team. Emilia dealt with a severe knee injury in 2012 which they reinjured in soon thereafter in 2013, ultimately not allowing them to make the U.S. Olympic team in Sochi. Emilia uses they/them pronouns.

References 

Living people
1994 births
People from Denver
American female freestyle skiers
American female alpine skiers